Justin Paul (born January 3, 1985) is an American theater and television composer and lyricist best known for his works The Greatest Showman, La La Land and Dear Evan Hansen, all of which he co-wrote with his songwriting partner, Benj Pasek.

Early life and education
Paul was born in Missouri, but raised in Connecticut. He attended Music Theatre of Connecticut School of Performing Arts, Coleytown Middle School, and Staples High School, both in Westport, Connecticut. While at Staples High School, he was an active member of the school's theater group, Staples Players. He graduated from the University of Michigan in December 2006 with a BFA in Musical Theatre.

Career
He is the co-creator, with Benj Pasek of the song cycle Edges. Also with Pasek, he is one of the songwriters for the Disney Channel show Johnny and the Sprites. Pasek and Paul won the Jonathan Larson Award in 2007. He also co-wrote and co-composed the musical Dogfight, which opened Off-Broadway at the Second Stage Theatre in July 2012. He also composed the musical James and the Giant Peach with Benj Pasek.

Pasek and Paul wrote the lyrics for the film musical La La Land. The film was written and directed by Damien Chazelle, and stars Emma Stone and Ryan Gosling. The film was the opening film at the 73rd Venice International Film Festival, on August 31, 2016.<ref>Gans, Andrew. [http://www.playbill.com/article/watch-new-trailer-for-forthcoming-la-la-land-movie-musical# "Watch New Trailer for Forthcoming La La Land' Movie Musical"] Playbill, August 23, 2016</ref> The duo won the 2017 Golden Globe Award for Best Original Song for "City of Stars." The pair received two Best Original Song nominations at the 89th Academy Awards, for "Audition (The Fools Who Dream)" and "City of Stars," alongside composer Justin Hurwitz. "City of Stars" won the award.

Pasek and Paul also wrote the original song "Runnin' Home to You" performed by Grant Gustin for the musical crossover episode of The Flash "Duet" between The Flash and Supergirl.

Most recently, they have created and written the score for the stage musical Dear Evan Hansen which premiered at the Arena Stage in Washington, D.C. in July 2015.  The musical, which has been called "striking for its moral complexity as well as its musical ambition", which opened on Broadway in December 2016. At the 71st Tony Awards, it is nominated for nine awards including Best Musical, Best Score, Best Book of a Musical, and Best Actor in a Musical for Platt.

In 2022, they won the Tony Award for Best Musical for serving as producers for the Broadway production of Michael R. Jackson's Pulitzer Prize-winning musical A Strange Loop''.

Personal life
Paul is married.  He and his wife have a daughter, born in 2016, and a son, born in 2018. In July 2020, they welcomed their third child.

The Pauls are practicing Christians.

Awards and nominations

†: Pasek and Paul became the youngest winners of the Jonathan Larson Grant in history.

Notes

External links

1985 births
American musical theatre composers
American musical theatre lyricists
Best Original Song Academy Award-winning songwriters
Broadway composers and lyricists
Golden Globe Award-winning musicians
Grammy Award winners
Living people
People from Westport, Connecticut
Songwriters from Connecticut
Songwriters from Missouri
Tony Award winners
University of Michigan School of Music, Theatre & Dance alumni
Staples High School alumni